"Keep Talking" is a song from Pink Floyd's 1994 album, The Division Bell.

Recording
Written by David Gilmour, Richard Wright and Polly Samson, it was sung by Gilmour and also features samples of Stephen Hawking's electronic voice, taken from a BT television advertisement. This same commercial was sampled again in "Talkin' Hawkin'" from Pink Floyd's next studio album, The Endless River.  Gilmour chose to use the speech after crying to the commercial, which he described as "the most powerful piece of television advertising that I’ve ever seen in my life.” The song also makes some use of the talk box guitar effect.

Release
The song was the first single to be released from the album in the United States in March 1994. It was the group's third #1 hit on the Album Rock Tracks chart (a chart published by Billboard magazine which measures radio play in the United States, and is not a measure of record sales), staying atop for six weeks.

The song was included on the 2001 compilation, Echoes: The Best of Pink Floyd.

Live
The song was performed every night during the 1994 The Division Bell Tour and live versions, taken from different shows, were included in both the album Pulse and the video of the same name.

The song was sampled by Wiz Khalifa on the title track of his 2009 mixtape Burn After Rolling.

Quotes

Personnel

Pink Floyd
David Gilmour – lead vocals, guitar, talk box, EBow
Richard Wright – Hammond organ, synthesizer
Nick Mason – drums, percussion

Additional musicians
Gary Wallis – programming
Jon Carin – programming, additional keyboards
Guy Pratt – bass guitar
Sam Brown – backing vocals
Durga McBroom – backing vocals
Carol Kenyon – backing vocals
Jackie Sheridan – backing vocals
Rebecca Leigh-White – backing vocals
Stephen Hawking – computer voice, sampled

Charts

Weekly charts

Year-end charts

Release history

References

1994 songs
Columbia Records singles
EMI Records singles
Pink Floyd songs
Stephen Hawking
Songs written by David Gilmour
Songs written by Richard Wright (musician)
Songs with lyrics by Polly Samson
Song recordings produced by Bob Ezrin
Song recordings produced by David Gilmour